Paul Julius Oswald Teichmüller (18 June 1913 – 11 September 1943) was a German mathematician who made contributions to complex analysis. He introduced quasiconformal mappings and differential geometric methods into the study of Riemann surfaces. Teichmüller spaces are named after him. He was a supporter of the Nazi regime.

Born in Nordhausen, Teichmüller attended the University of Göttingen, where he graduated in 1935 under the supervision of Helmut Hasse. His doctoral dissertation was on operator theory, though this was his only work on functional analysis. His next few papers were algebraic, but he switched his focus to complex analysis after attending lectures given by Rolf Nevanlinna. In 1937, he moved to the University of Berlin to work with Ludwig Bieberbach. Bieberbach was the editor of Deutsche Mathematik and much of Teichmüller's work was published in the journal, which made his papers hard to find in modern libraries before the release of his collected works.

A member of the Nazi Party (NSDAP) and Sturmabteilung (SA), the military wing of the NSDAP, from 1931, Teichmüller agitated against his Jewish professors Richard Courant and Edmund Landau in 1933. He was drafted into the Wehrmacht in July 1939 and took part in the invasion of Norway in 1940 before being recalled to Berlin to undertake cryptographic work with the Cipher Department of the High Command of the Wehrmacht. In 1942, he was released from his military duties and returned to teach at the University of Berlin. After the German defeat at Stalingrad in February 1943, he gave up his position in Berlin to volunteer for combat on the Eastern Front. He was killed in action in September 1943.

Sanford L. Segal, a professor of mathematics at the University of Rochester, in his 2003 book Mathematicians Under the Nazis said: "Teichmüller was a gifted, brilliant, and seminal mathematician; he was also a dedicated Nazi."

Biography

Early life
Paul Julius Oswald Teichmüller was born in Nordhausen, and grew up in Sankt Andreasberg. His parents were Gertrude (née Dinse) and Adolf Julius Paul Teichmüller. At the time of Oswald's birth, his father, a weaver, was 33 and his mother was 39; they had no further children. His father was injured during World War I and died when Oswald was 12. According to Gertrude, when Oswald was three she discovered that he knew how to count and had learned to read on his own. After his father's death, she took him out of his school in Sankt Andreasberg which "he had long outgrown" and sent him to live with his aunt in Nordhausen, where he attended the Gymnasium.

Education
Teichmüller received his Abitur in 1931, and enrolled at the University of Göttingen as a "brilliant but lonely student from the hinterlands." Hans Lewy, a young instructor at Göttingen at the time, later told anecdotes of the ungainly Teichmüller's brilliance. Among Teichmüller's professors were Richard Courant, Gustav Herglotz, Edmund Landau, Otto Neugebauer and Hermann Weyl. He also joined the NSDAP in July 1931 and became a member of the Sturmabteilung in August 1931. On 2 November 1933 he organised the boycott of his Jewish professor Edmund Landau; in 1994, Friedrich L. Bauer described Teichmüller as a "genius" but a "fanatic Nazi" who "stood out with his agitation against Landau and Courant." Teichmüller later met Landau in his office to discuss the boycott, and penned a letter, at Landau's request, regarding his motivation:

In 1934, Teichmüller wrote a draft dissertation on operator theory, which he titled Operatoren im Wachsschen Raum. The draft related to lectures he had received from Franz Rellich, but he did not bring his dissertation proposal to Rellich due to the fact Rellich was previously the assistant to the Jewish professor Richard Courant who fled Germany in 1933. Teichmüller instead brought it to Helmut Hasse. Operator theory was not in Hasse's area of expertise, so he sent it to Gottfried Köthe. Köthe's comments helped Teichmüller polish the dissertation, and Teichmüller submitted it for review on 10 June 1935 to his examining committee which consisted of Hasse, Herglotz and the Göttingen physicist Robert Pohl. Teichmüller passed his doctoral exam on 28 June 1935 and was officially awarded his Ph.D in mathematics in November 1935.

Academic career
After Teichmüller passed his doctoral exam in June 1935, Hasse petitioned for the university to appoint Teichmüller as an assistant professor in the mathematical department. In his letter he stated Teichmüller had "extraordinary mathematical gifts" and that his teaching style was "painfully exact, in high degree suggestive, and impressive sort." Teichmüller received the position and began to devote himself more to mathematics at the expense of politics, which led fellow NSDAP members to describe him as "eccentric".

Teichmüller's doctoral dissertation was his only work on functional analysis, and his next few papers were algebraic, showing the influence Hasse had on him. In late 1936, he began to work on his habilitation thesis so that he could move to the University of Berlin to work with Ludwig Bieberbach, an outstanding mathematician, staunch supporter of the NSDAP and the editor of Deutsche Mathematik. Teichmüller's habilitation thesis, Untersuchungen über konforme und quasikonforme Abbildungen, was not influenced by Hasse, but by the lectures of Rolf Nevanlinna, who was a visiting professor at the University of Göttingen. Under the influence of Nevanlinna, Teichmüller moved away from algebra and developed an interest in complex analysis. He made four contributions to Deutsche Mathematik in 1936, three of them algebraic, but thereafter he published just one algebraic paper.

Teichmüller moved to Berlin in April 1937, and habilitated at the University of Berlin in March 1938. In Berlin with Bieberbach, Teichmüller had someone who shared his political views and who was also an exceptional mathematician, which led to two years of great productivity. Between April 1937 and July 1939, Teichmüller published seven papers in addition to his 197-page monograph on "extremal quasiconformal mappings and quadratic differentials," which laid the basis for the theory of the Teichmüller space.

World War II
On 18 July 1939, Teichmüller was drafted into the Wehrmacht. He was originally intended to do only eight weeks' training but World War II broke out before the eight weeks were up so he remained in the army and took part in Operation Weserübung in April 1940. Afterwards, he was recalled to Berlin where he became involved in cryptographic work along with other mathematicians such as Ernst Witt, Georg Aumann, Alexander Aigner and Wolfgang Franz in the Cipher Department of the High Command of the Wehrmacht.

In 1941, Bieberbach requested that Teichmüller be released from his military duties in order to continue teaching at the University of Berlin. This request was granted and he was able to teach at the university from 1942 to early 1943. After the German defeat at Stalingrad in February 1943, however, Teichmüller left his position in Berlin and volunteered for combat on the Eastern Front, entering a unit which became involved in the Battle of Kursk. In the beginning of August, he received furlough when his unit reached Kharkiv. His unit was surrounded by Soviet troops and largely wiped out by late August, but in early September he attempted to rejoin them. He is reported to have reached somewhere east of the Dnieper but west of Kharkiv (most likely Poltava), where he was killed in action on 11 September 1943.

Mathematical works
In his career, Teichmüller wrote 34 papers in the space of around 6 years. His early algebraic investigations dealt with the valuation theory of fields and the structure of algebras. In valuation theory, he introduced multiplicative systems of representatives of the residue field of valuation rings, which led to a characterisation of the structure of the whole field in terms of the residue field. In the theory of algebras, he started to generalise Emmy Noether's concept of crossed products from fields to certain kind of algebras, gaining new insights into the structure of p-algebras. Although from 1937 on his main interests shifted to geometric function theory, Teichmüller did not give up algebra; in a paper published in 1940, he explored further steps toward a Galois theory of algebras, resulting in the introduction of a group that was later recognised as a third Galois cohomology group.

After his habilitation in 1938, Teichmüller turned to questions in the variation of conformal structures on surfaces, raised earlier by Bernhard Riemann, Henri Poincaré, Felix Klein, and Robert Fricke. His most important innovation was the introduction of quasiconformal mappings to the field, using ideas first developed by Herbert Grötzsch and Lars Ahlfors in different contexts. Teichmüller's main conjecture stated that variation of conformal structure can be realised uniquely by extremal quasiconformal mappings. Teichmüller also established a connection between extremal quasiconformal mappings and regular quadratic differentials using a class of related reciprocal Beltrami differentials, which led him to another conjecture proclaiming the existence of a bicontinuous bijective correspondence Φ between a space T1, of real parts of certain reciprocal Beltrami differentials and Mg, n the moduli space of all conformal structures considered. In fact, he proved the existence and injectivity of Φ.

Teichmüller also showed the existence of extremal quasiconformal mappings in the special case of certain simply connected plane regions. He then gave an existence proof for surface of type (g, 0) by a continuity argument from the uniformisation theorem and Finsler metrics. This was also intended as a first step toward a deeper investigation of moduli spaces; in one of his last papers he sketched an idea of how to endow moduli spaces with an analytic structure and how to construct an analytic fiber space of Riemann surfaces. Due to his early death, Teichmüller could not fully work out most of his ideas. However, they became seminal for later work by other mathematicians.

In 1984, Swiss mathematician Kurt Strebel gave an overview of Lars Ahlfors and Frederick Gehring's 1982 work Oswald Teichmüller: Gesammelte Abhandlungen:

From 2007 to 2020, the European Mathematical Society published seven volumes of the Handbook of Teichmüller Theory. The volumes contain English translations of Teichmüller's papers on complex analysis and on the field called Teichmüller theory. The volumes are edited by University of Strasbourg professor Athanase Papadopoulos.

Publications

See also
 Grothendieck–Teichmüller group
 Inter-universal Teichmüller theory
 p-adic Teichmüller theory
 Universal Teichmüller space

References

Sources

External links

1913 births
1943 deaths
People from Nordhausen, Thuringia
People from the Province of Saxony
20th-century German mathematicians
German cryptographers
German Army personnel killed in World War II
Academic staff of the Humboldt University of Berlin
Nazi Party members
Sturmabteilung personnel
University of Göttingen alumni
German Army personnel of World War II